Typhlatya is a genus of shrimp in the family Atyidae. These are small, stygobitic shrimp found in the West Mediterranean region (France and Spain), Caribbean region (the Antilles, Bahamas and Yucatán), Ascension Island and the Galápagos, although the individual species often have very small ranges. Species in this genus are found in salt, brackish and fresh waters, mostly in anchialine habitats and none in the open sea.

Taxonomy, species and conservation

There are currently 17 recognized species, of which one is listed by the IUCN as critically endangered (marked "CR" below), and six are considered vulnerable (marked "VU"). Phylogenetic studies indicate that the genus as presently defined is paraphyletic and needs to be redefined, as T. galapagensis clusters with the widespread Antecaridina and T. monae likely with the Australian Stygiocaris. On a higher level, these three genera, together with Halocaridina and Halocaridinides, form a group. In addition to the species below, "Typhlatya" jusbaschjani (Georgia) and "Typhlatya" pretneri (Hercegovina) have been listed in this genus, but the former is a species inquirenda and recent authorities generally include the latter in Troglocaris.

Typhlatya arfeae Jaume & Bréhier, 2005 – France
Typhlatya campecheae H. H. Hobbs III & H. H. Hobbs Jr., 1976 – Yucatán Peninsula
Typhlatya consobrina Botoşăneanu & Holthuis, 1970 – Cuba 
Typhlatya dzilamensis Alvarez, Iliffe & Villalobos, 2005 – Yucatán Peninsula
Typhlatya elenae Juarrero, 1994 – Cuba 
Typhlatya galapagensis Monod & Cals, 1970 – Galápagos Islands
Typhlatya garciadebrasi Juarrero de Varona & Ortiz, 2000 – Cuba 
Typhlatya garciai Chace, 1942 – Cuba and possibly Caicos Island 
Typhlatya iliffei C. W. J. Hart & Manning, 1981 – Bermuda 
Typhlatya kakuki Alvarez, Iliffe & Villalobos, 2005 – Bahamas
Typhlatya miravetensis Sanz & Platvoet, 1995 – Spain 
Typhlatya mitchelli H. H. Hobbs III & H. H. Hobbs Jr., 1976 – Yucatán Peninsula
Typhlatya monae Chace, 1954 – widely across Caribbean islands
Typhlatya pearsei Creaser, 1936 – Yucatán Peninsula
Typhlatya rogersi Chace & Manning, 1972 – Ascension Island
Typhlatya taina Estrada & Gómez, 1987 – Cuba 
Typhlatya utilaensis Alvarez, Iliffe & Villalobos, 2005 – Utila Island

References

Further reading

Atyidae
Taxonomy articles created by Polbot